Nebria tristicula is a species of black coloured ground beetle in the Nebriinae subfamily that can be found in Georgia and Russia, in Yatyrgvart mountains.

References

tristicula
Beetles described in 1888
Beetles of Asia